Déflaboxe is the fourth studio album by Québécois singer and musician Daniel Bélanger.
Déflaboxe is a concept album about a has-been box fighter. The sound of this album differs from his usual pop/rock sound to a Trip-Hop sound sampling various old Québecois records. Bélanger also uses a vocal delivery similar to slam.

Track listing
"Intro" - 3:34
"Round 1" - 2:48
"Round 2" - 3:04
"Round 3" - 5:38
"Round 4" - 3:04
"Round 5" - 3:34
"Round 6" - 4:20
"Round 7" - 3:59
"Round 8" - 3:21
"Round 9" - 3:49
"Round 10" - 3:40

Personnel
Daniel Bélanger - Vocals, Lyrics, Programmation''
Carl Bastien - Keyboard, Bass, Drums, Guitar
Martin Roy - Bass
Jean-François Lauzon - Drums
Alain Bergé - Drums

References

2003 albums
Daniel Bélanger albums
Audiogram (label) albums